Tanunda may refer to  the following places and organisations in South Australia.

Tanunda, South Australia, a town and locality
Tanunda Liedertafel, a German language  male choir 
Tanunda Town Band, a brass band
Tanunda railway station, a former railway station

See also
Liedertafel (disambiguation)